Vale Formoso is a former civil parish in the municipality of Covilhã, Castelo Branco District, Portugal. In 2013, the parish merged into the new parish Vale Formoso e Aldeia do Souto. It had a population of 640, in 2001, and an area of 11.31 km2 (4,37 mi2), in 2012.

It changed its name on 6 August 1944, having previously been called "Aldeia do Mato."

References

Former parishes of Covilhã